Uetliberg or Üetliberg may refer to:
Uetliberg, a mountain near to the Swiss city of Zurich
Uetliberg railway line, a suburban railway in the Swiss city of Zurich
Uetliberg (ship, 1999), a passenger ship on Lake Zurich